Ch'ŏlgwang station is a railway station of the Korean State Railway in Ch'ŏlsal-li, Ŭnnyul County, South Hwanghae Province, North Korea. It is the western terminus of the Ŭnnyul Line and the southern terminus of the Sŏhae Kammun Line; it was also the starting point of the narrow-gauge Sŏhaeri Line.

History
Ch'ŏlgwang station was opened by the Korean State Railway in 1963, along with the rest of the Sugyo–Ch'ŏlgwang section of the Ŭnnyul Line.

Services
Ch'ŏlgwang station is served by regional passenger trains 219/220, to and from Taedonggang, and a local train 361/362, to and from Namp'o.

References

Railway stations in North Korea